The daubed shanny (Leptoclinus maculatus), also known as the spotted snakeblenny, is a species of marine ray-finned fish belonging to the family Stichaeidae.

It is native to the coasts of Northern Atlantic Ocean and Northern Pacific Ocean.

References

Lumpeninae